The 2018–19 Penn State Nittany Lions men's ice hockey season was the 13th season of play for the program and the 6th season in the Big Ten Conference. The Nittany Lions represented Pennsylvania State University and were coached by Guy Gadowsky, in his 8th season.

Season
Playing most of their non-conference schedule at home, Penn State rose up the rankings with a hot start to the season. The team cooled off when their conference schedule began and the Nittany Lions could not find any consistency for several months. Penn State ended up a game below .500 in the Big Ten standings and faced the prospect of having to win the Big Ten Tournament to receive an NCAA berth. After a rocky start the Nittany Lions overcame Wisconsin in the quarterfinal round, then pulled off an upset over top-ranked Ohio State to set PSU against Notre Dame. Both teams faced a win or go home scenario and played a close game throughout. The Fighting Irish gained three separate 1-goal leads and they were able to keep their final edge, holding Penn State off in the third period despite a barrage of shots from the Lions' nation-leading offense.

Departures

Recruiting

Roster

As of September 3, 2018.

Standings

Schedule and Results

|-
!colspan=12 style=";" | Exhibition

|-
!colspan=12 style=";" | Regular Season

|-
!colspan=12 style=";" | 

|- align="center" bgcolor="#e0e0e0"
|colspan=12|Penn State wins series 2–1

Scoring Statistics

Goaltending statistics

Rankings

Players drafted into the NHL

2019 NHL Entry Draft

† incoming freshman

References

External links

Penn State Nittany Lions men's ice hockey seasons
Penn State Nittany Lions
Penn State Nittany Lions
2019 in sports in Pennsylvania
2018 in sports in Pennsylvania